Duncan McLean may refer to:

 Duncan McLean (footballer, born 1868) (1868–1941), Scottish international footballer with Everton and Liverpool
 Duncan McLean (footballer, born 1874) (1874–after 1952), Scottish footballer with Partick Thistle and Southampton
 Duncan McLean (writer) (born 1964), Scottish novelist, playwright, and short story writer
 Duncan McLean, Australian founder of Way Funky Company Pte Ltd, a swimwear apparel manufacturing company